Mademoiselle Has Fun (French: Mademoiselle s'amuse) is a 1948 French comedy film directed by Jean Boyer and starring Ray Ventura, Giselle Pascal and Bernard Lancret. It portrays the adventures of an American heiress in France.

Cast
 Ray Ventura as Ray Ventura  
 Giselle Pascal as Christine Gibson 
 Bernard Lancret as Jacques Roussel 
 Catherine Gay as Thérèse  
 Jeannette Batti as Fifi  
 Max Elloy 
 Henri Legay 
 André Toffel 
 Henri Salvador as Henri Salvador  
 Georges Tourreil as Le commissaire  
 Germaine Reuver as La cuisinière  
 Marcel Charvey 
 Nicolas Amato
 Christiane Barry as Édith  
 Roland Bailly as Gégène 
 Lucien Hector as Un domestique  
 René Stern as Le proviseur  
 Georgé 
 Georges Lannes as Georgey  
 Jeanne Fusier-Gir as Mlle. Agathe  
 André Randall as William Gibson  
 Annette Poivre as Miette 
 Léon Bary as Le gérant  
 Rivers Cadet as L'agent  
 Gregori Chmara as Petit rôle  
 Janine Clairville as Petit rôle  
 Marguerite de Morlaye as La marquise  
 Jacqueline Huet 
 Marcel Loche as Le garçon  
 Julien Maffre as Un dur  
 Frédéric O'Brady as Petit rôle  
 Ray Ventura Orchestra as L'orchestre  
 Guy Saint-Clair as Petit rôle  
 René Sauvaire as Petit rôle

References

Bibliography 
 Rège, Philippe. Encyclopedia of French Film Directors, Volume 1. Scarecrow Press, 2009.

External links 
 

1948 films
French comedy films
1948 comedy films
1940s French-language films
Films directed by Jean Boyer
French black-and-white films
1940s French films